Osmin purple basil is a cultivar of Ocimum basilicum (sweet basil) with dark purple leaves. It is distinguished from other purple basil varieties by smaller, darker leaves. It has the darkest leaves of any purple basil variety.

It is a flower.

References

Ocimum
Herbs